Kidnapped, a 2007 graphic novel by Alan Grant (words) and Cam Kennedy (artwork), is adapted from Robert Louis Stevenson's 1886 novel Kidnapped. It was commissioned as part of the events to celebrate Edinburgh being named the first UNESCO City of Literature.

Some of the art for this has been bought for the collections of the National Library of Scotland, and some also appeared in Edinburgh Evening News. 7500 free copies of it were printed.

Grant claims to have read the original novel six times to familiarise himself fully with the source material, and decided to use as much of the original dialogue as possible.

It has also been translated into Lowland Scots, as Kidnappit by Matthew Fitt, and James Robertson, and it has been translated to Scots Gaelic as Fo Bhruid by Iain MacDhòmhnaill.

References

External links
 Down the Tubes Kidnapping Edinburgh
 Grovel review
 Review by Edward Berridge

Graphic novel
Scottish graphic novels
Comics based on fiction
Comics by Alan Grant (writer)